Hectaphelia sporadias is a species of moth of the family Tortricidae. It is found in Northern Cape, South Africa.

References

Endemic moths of South Africa
Moths described in 1920
Archipini